Roy James Brown (September 10, 1920 or 1925May 25, 1981) was an American blues singer who had a significant influence on the early development of rock and roll and the direction of R&B. His original song and hit recording "Good Rockin' Tonight" has been covered by many artists including Wynonie Harris, Elvis Presley, Bruce Springsteen, Paul McCartney, Joe Ely, Ricky Nelson, Jerry Lee Lewis, Pat Boone, James Brown, the Doors, and the rock group Montrose. Brown was one of the first popular R&B singers to perform songs with a gospel-steeped delivery, which was then considered taboo by many churches. In addition, his melismatic, pleading vocal style influenced notable artists such as B.B. King, Bobby Bland, Elvis Presley, Jackie Wilson, James Brown and Little Richard.

Early life and education
Brown was born in Kinder, Louisiana. Some sources report his birth date as September 10, 1925, but the researchers Bob Eagle and Eric LeBlanc gave the date as September 10, 1920, on the basis of information in the 1930 census and Social Security records, and stated that 1925 is incorrect.  Media reports state that he was either 55 or 56 at the time of his death.

Like many R&B singers, Brown started singing gospel music in church. His mother was an accomplished singer and church organist. He moved to Los Angeles in the 1940s and for a short time was a professional boxer in the welterweight division. In 1945 he won a singing contest at the Million Dollar Theater, covering "There's No You", originally recorded by Bing Crosby. In 1946, Brown moved to Galveston, Texas, where he sang in Joe Coleman's group, performing mostly songs from the Hit Parade, in a nightclub called the Club Granada. His repertoire included "Good Rockin' Tonight".

After being rejected by the armed forces because of flat feet, Brown secured his first major job in a club in Shreveport, Louisiana, singing mostly pop ballads, such as "Stardust" and "Blue Hawaii". The owner of Bill Riley's Palace Park hired him, as Brown told an interviewer for Blues Unlimited, because of his appeal as "a Negro singer who sounds white." It was at the Palace Park that Brown started developing a blues repertoire, learning contemporary R&B tunes such as "Jelly Jelly" (recorded by Billy Eckstine). He returned to New Orleans in 1947, where he performed at the Dew Drop Inn.

Career
Brown was a fan of blues singer Wynonie Harris. When Harris appeared in town, Brown tried but failed to interest him in listening to "Good Rockin' Tonight". Brown then approached another blues singer, Cecil Gant, who was performing at another club in town. Brown introduced his song, and Gant had him sing it over the telephone to the president of De Luxe Records, Jules Braun, reportedly at 4:00 in the morning. Brown was signed to a recording contract immediately. He recorded the song in a jump blues style with a swing beat. It was released in 1948 and reached number 13 on the Billboard R&B chart. Ironically, Harris recorded a cover version of the song, and his version rose to the top of the Billboard R&B chart later in 1948. Presley also covered the song for Sun Records in 1954; it was re-released by RCA Victor when his recording contract was sold to that label in 1956. According to the Paul McCartney Project, "the song has also been credited with being the most successful record to that point to use the word 'rock' not as a euphemism for sex, but as a descriptive for the musical style.

Brown continued to make his mark on the R&B charts, having 14 hits for De Luxe from mid-1948 to late 1951, including "Hard Luck Blues" (1950, his biggest seller), "Love Don't Love Nobody", "Rockin' at Midnight", "Boogie at Midnight", "Miss Fanny Brown", and "Cadillac Baby", making him, along with Harris, one of the top R&B performers in those three years. One source suggests that Brown was the "best selling R&B artist from 1949-51". Another states that during 1948–51, "he had 15 records on the charts". A third source adds that Brown "chalked up a dozen top 10s".

After his popularity had peaked, Brown began to experience a lull in his career. Doo-wop and R&B groups were quickly gaining popularity as the standard sound of R&B in the early to mid-1950s. His declining fortune coincided with the resolution of a lawsuit against King Records for unpaid royalties in 1952, in which Brown prevailed, one of the few African-American musicians to do so in the 1950s. This coincidence has led some, such as the writer Nick Tosches (in his book Unsung Heroes of Rock 'n' Roll, which contains a chapter on Brown) to believe that Brown may have been blacklisted. Brown's other misfortunes included trouble with the Internal Revenue Service. When confronted by the government for unpaid taxes he owed, he approached Elvis Presley for help. Presley wrote him a check on a brown paper bag, but it was not enough to keep Brown out of prison for tax evasion.

In 1951, Brown performed at the seventh famed Cavalcade of Jazz concert held at Wrigley Field in Los Angeles which was produced by Leon Hefflin, Sr. on July 8. Also featured were Lionel Hampton and his Revue, Percy Mayfield, Jimmy Witherspoon, Joe Liggins' Honeydrippers and Billy Eckstine. The following year, June 1, 1952, he performed for the eighth Cavalcade of Jazz concert with His Mighty Men.  Also featured that day were Anna Mae Winburn and Her Sweethearts, Jerry Wallace, Toni Harper, Louis Jordan, Jimmy Witherspoon and Josephine Baker. And Brown came back in 1953 to play at the 9th Cavalcade of Jazz on June 7.   Also featured that day were, Don Tosti and His Mexican Jazzmen, Earl Bostic, Nat "King" Cole,  Shorty Roger's Orchestra, and Louis Armstrong and his All Stars with Velma Middleton,.

Brown had a brief comeback on Imperial Records in 1957. Working with Dave Bartholomew, he returned to the charts with the original version of "Let the Four Winds Blow", co-written with Fats Domino, who would later have a hit with it.

Brown returned to King Records, but his popularity had diminished by 1959. He found sporadic work, performing wherever he was wanted, and he made some recordings through the 1960s. To supplement his income, he sold the rights to "Good Rockin' Tonight". "I was selling door to door," he reminisced, referring to his stint as an encyclopedia salesman.

In 1970, Brown closed The Johnny Otis Show at the Monterey Jazz Festival. As a result of the positive reception by the audience, he recorded "Love for Sale", which became a hit for Mercury Records.

Later life and death
In the late 1970s, a compilation album of his old recordings brought about a minor revival of interest in his music. In 1978, he made a successful tour in Scandinavia following the releases of Laughing but Crying and Good Rockin' Tonight. Shortly before his death he performed at the Whisky a Go Go in West Hollywood, California, and he was a headliner at the New Orleans Jazz and Heritage Festival in 1981, dying a month later.

According to The Guardian, "in 1952 he attempted to sue his manager for unpaid royalties, but succeeded only in getting himself blackballed from the music industry. He spent much of his life as a door-to-door encyclopedia salesman". In truth, he made a comeback in 1970, performing at the Monterey Jazz Festival; he continued touring for "the rest of the decade", including a tour of Europe in 1978.
 
Brown died of a heart attack on May 25, 1981, at Pacoima Lutheran Memorial Hospital, near his home in the San Fernando Valley. The Reverend Johnny Otis conducted the funeral service.

Years later, Little Richard said that Roy Brown had been one of the artists that inspired him in the early years.

Legacy
Brown was posthumously inducted into the Blues Hall of Fame in 1981.

Two of his songs, "Butcher Pete, Pt. 1" and "Mighty Mighty Man" are featured in the 2008 video game, Fallout 3. "Butcher Pete, Pt. 1", "Butcher Pete, Pt. 2", "Good Rockin' Tonight", and "Mighty Mighty Man" are featured in the 2015 sequel, Fallout 4.   There is a quest named after his song "Hard Luck Blues" in the video game Fallout: New Vegas.

Discography

Chart singles

Original 10" shellac (78-rpm) and 7" vinyl (45-rpm) releases
 Gold Star 636, "Deep Sea Diver" / "Bye Baby Bye", 1947
 DeLuxe 1093, "Good Rockin Tonight" / "Lolly Pop Mama", 1947
 DeLuxe 1098, "Special Lesson No. 1" / "Woman's a Wonderful Thing", 1947
 DeLuxe 1107, "Roy Brown Boogie" / "Please Don't Go (Come Back Baby)", 1947
 DeLuxe 1128, "Mighty Mighty Man" / "Miss Fanny Brown", 1947
 DeLuxe 1154, "Long About Midnight" / "Whose Hat Is That", 1948	
 DeLuxe 1166, "All My Love Belongs to You" / "Ebony Rhapsody" (B-side by Ethel Morris), 1948
 DeLuxe 3093, "Good Rockin' Tonight" / "Lolly Pop Mama" (reissue), 1950 (also issued as Miltone 3093)
 DeLuxe 3098, "Special Lesson No. 1" / "Woman's a Wonderful Thing" (reissue), 1950
 DeLuxe 3107, "Roy Brown Boogie" / "Please Don't Go (Come Back Baby)" (reissue), 1950
 DeLuxe 3128, "Mighty Mighty Man" / "Miss Fanny Brown" (reissue), 1950
 DeLuxe 3154, "Long About Midnight" / "Whose Hat Is That" (reissue), 1950 (also issued as Miltone 3154)
 DeLuxe 3166, "All My Love Belongs to You" / "Ebony Rhapsody" (B-side by Ethel Morris) (reissue), 1950
 DeLuxe 3189, "Miss Fanny Brown Returns" / "Roy Brown Boogie", 1948
 DeLuxe 3198, "Fore Day in the Morning" / "Rainy Weather Blues", 1948 (also issued as Miltone 3198)
 DeLuxe 3212, "Rockin' at Midnight" / "Judgement Day Blues", 1949
 DeLuxe 3226, "Please Don't Go (Come Back Baby)" / "Riding High", 1949
 DeLuxe 3300, "Boogie at Midnight" / "The Blues Got Me Again", 1949
 DeLuxe 3301, "Butcher Pete, Part 1" / "Butcher Pete, Part 2", 1949
 DeLuxe 3302, "I Feel That Young Man's Rhythm" / "End of My Journey" 1949
 DeLuxe 3304, "Hard Luck Blues" / "New Rebecca" 1950
 DeLuxe 3306, "Dreaming Blues" / "Love Don't Love Nobody", 1950
 DeLuxe 3308, "Long About Sundown" / "Cadillac Baby", 1950
 DeLuxe 3311, "Double Crossin' Woman" / "Teen Age Jamboree", 1951
 DeLuxe 3312, "Sweet Peach" / "Good Man Blues", 1951
 DeLuxe 3313, "Beautician Blues" / "Wrong Woman Blues", 1951 
 DeLuxe 3318, "Train Time Blues" / "Big Town", 1951
 DeLuxe 3319, "Bar Room Blues" / "Good Rockin' Man", 1951
 DeLuxe 3323, "Brown Angel" / "I've Got the Last Laugh Now", 1952
 King 4602, "Hurry Hurry Baby" / "Travelin' Man", 1953
 King 4609. "Grandpa Stole My Baby" / "Money Can't Buy Love", 1953
 King 4627, "Mr. Hound Dog's in Town" / "Gamblin' Man", 1953
 King 4637, "Old Age Boogie, Part 1" / "Old Age Boogie, Part 2", 1953
 King 4654, "Laughing but Crying" / "Crazy Crazy Women", 1953
 King 4669, "Caldonia's Wedding Day" / "A Fool in Love", 1953
 King 4684, "Midnight Lover Man" / "Letter from Home", 1953
 King 4689, "Everything's Alright" / "Lonesome Lover", 1953
 King 4704, "Bootleggin' Baby" / "Trouble at Midnight", 1954
 King 4715, "Up Jumped the Devil" / "This Is My Last Goodbye", 1954
 King 4722, "Don't Let It Rain" / "No Love at All", 1954
 King 4731, "Ain't It a Shame" / "Gal from Kokomo", 1954
 King 4743, "Worried Life Blues" / "Black Diamond", 1954
 King 4761, "Fannie Brown Got Married" / "Queen of Diamonds", 1954
 King 4816, "Shake 'Em Up Baby" / "Letter to Baby", 1955
 King 4834, "She's Gone Too Long" / "My Little Angel Child", 1955
 Imperial 5422, "Saturday Night (That's My Night)" / "Everybody", 1956
 Imperial 5427, "Party Doll" / "I'm Stickin' with You", 1957
 Imperial 5439, "Let the Four Winds Blow" / "Diddy-Y-Diddy-O", 1957
 Imperial 5455, "I'm Convicted of Love" / "I'm Ready to Play", 1957
 Imperial 5469, "The Tick of the Clock" / "Slow Down Little Eva", 1957
 Imperial 5489, "Ain't Gonna Do It" / "Sail on Little Girl", 1958
 Imperial 5510, "Hip Shakin' Baby" / "Be My Love Tonight", 1958
 Imperial 5969, "Let the Four Winds Blow" / "Diddy-Yi-Diddy-Yo" (reissue), 1963
 King 5178, "La-Dee-Dah-Dee" / "Melinda", 1959
 King 5207, "Rinky Dinky Doo" / "I Never Had It So Good", 1959
 King 5218, "Good Looking and Foxy Too" / "Hard Luck Blues, 1959
 King 5247, "School Bell Rock" / "Ain't No Rocking No More", 1959
 King 5333, "Ain't Got No Blues Today" / "Adorable One", 1960
 King 5521, "Mighty Mighty Man" / "Good Man Blues", 1962
 Home of the Blues 107, "A Man with the Blues" / "Don't Break My Heart", 1960
 Home of the Blues 110, "Rocking All the Time" / "Tired of Being Alone", 1960
 Home of the Blues 115, "Sugar Baby" / "Oh So Wonderful", 1961 
 Home of the Blues 122, "Rock and Roll Jamboree" / "I Need a Friend", 1961
 Dra 321, "Goliath" / "Stop the Twist", 1962
 Summit 1001, "She's Alright" / "Let the Four Winds Blow", 1963
 ABC-Bluesway 61002, "New Orleans Women" / "Standing on Broadway (Watching the Girls)", 1967
 Gert 11123, "Baby It's Love" / "Going Home" 1968
 Gert 400, "The Message" / "Great Casaboo", 1968
 Tru-Love 448, "Good Sweet Loving" / "Separation Blues", 1968  
 Tru-Love 449, "I'm Making Love" / "Rocks Is My Pillow", 1968
 Connie 303/304, "Young Blood Twist" / "I Love a Woman ", 1969
 Friendship 701, "It's My Fault Darling" / "Love for Sale", 1970
 Mercury 73166, "Love for Sale" / "It's My Fault Darling" (reissue), 1970
 Mercury 73219, "Hunky Funky Woman" / "Mail Man Blues", 1971
 Mobile Fidelity Productions MFP-2, "in the Eyes of My People" / "You've Got a Friend", 1972
 Topflight 103, "Hard Times" / "Separation Blues", 19??

LP releases of note
 King 536, Rock 'n' Roll Dance Party, various artists (including Brown), 1956
 King 607, Battle of the Blues, album shared with Wynonie Harris, 1958
 King 627, Battle of the Blues, Volume 2, album shared with Wynonie Harris 1959
 King 668, Battle of the Blues, Volume 4, album shared with Eddie Cleanhead Vinson and Wynonie Harris, 1959
 King 956, Roy Brown Sings 24 Hits, 2-LP set, 1966
 ABC-Bluesway BLS-6019, The Blues Are All Brown, 1968
 ABC-Bluesway BLS-6056, Hard Times: The Classic Blues of Roy Brown, 1973, same as BLS-6019
 King KS-1130, Hard Luck Blues, 1976
 Gusto GD-5036X, Hard Luck Blues, 2-LP set, 1976
 Route 66 KIX-2, Laughing but Crying, recorded 1947–1959, released 1977
 Route 66 KIX-6, Good Rockin' Tonight, recorded 1947–1954, released 1978
 Friendship RB-701, We Came to Party, 1978
 Faith 91020, Cheapest Price in Town, 1978
 Solid Smoke SS-8009, San Francisco Blues Festival, Vol. 1, album shared with Lowell Fulson (one side for each), 1981 
 Mr. R&B 104, Saturday Nite, recorded 1952–1959, released 1984
 Route 66 KIX-26, I Feel That Young Man's Rhythm, recorded 1947–1955, released 1985
 Charly CRB-1093, Boogie at Midnight, recorded 1947–1959, released 1985

CD releases of note
 Ace CHD-459, Mighty Mighty Man!, recorded 1953–1955 and 1959 for King Records, released 1993
 Rhino 71545, Good Rockin' Tonight: The Best of Roy Brown, recorded 1947–1957, released 1994
 Capitol-EMI 31743, The Complete Imperial Recordings, recorded 1956–1958 for Imperial Records, released 1995
 Classics (Blues & Rhythm Series) 5021, The Chronological Roy Brown 1947–1949, released 2002
 Classics (Blues & Rhythm Series) 5036, The Chronological Roy Brown 1950–1951, released 2002
 Classics (Blues & Rhythm Series) 5090, The Chronological Roy Brown 1951–1953, released 2004
 Collectables 2882, Rockin' at Midnight: The Very Best of Roy Brown, recorded 1947–1959, released 2004
 Ace CHD-1072, Good Rockin' Brown: The King & DeLuxe Acetate Series, recorded 1947 for DeLuxe Records, released 2005
 Fantastic Voyage FVDD-123, Good Rockin' Man: The Definitive Collection, 2-CD set, recorded 1947–1960, released 2011
 Jasmine JASMCD-3098, Good Rockin' Tonight: All His Greatest Hits + Selected Singles As & Bs 1947–1958, 2-CD set, released 2018

See also
List of artists who reached number one on the Billboard R&B chart
List of blues musicians
List of jump blues musicians
West Coast blues

References

External links
Rocknrollshow.co.uk biography
Rockabilly.nl biography

1920 births
1981 deaths
20th-century African-American male singers
American blues singers
King Records artists
Imperial Records artists
Rhythm and blues musicians from New Orleans
American rhythm and blues musicians
ABC Records artists
West Coast blues musicians
Jump blues musicians
Blues musicians from New Orleans
Singers from Louisiana
People from Allen Parish, Louisiana